Richard Gardner "Dick" Shoup (November 29, 1923 – November 25, 1995) was a U.S. Representative from Montana, great-grandson of George Laird Shoup.

Education 
Born in Salmon, Idaho, Shoup attended the Salmon public schools. He received his B.S. from the University of Montana in Missoula, Montana in 1950.

Military 
He served in the United States Army, European Theater, Field Artillery from 1943 to 1946. He served in the Korean War from 1951 to 1952.

Early career 
He was owner-operator of a laundry and dry cleaning business from 1954 to 1967. He was employed in the agriculture service department of Montana Flour Mills from 1953 to 1954.

Political career 
Shoup was elected alderman on the Missoula City Council from 1963 to 1967, serving as president from 1965 to 1967. He served as mayor of Missoula, Montana from 1967 to 1970.
He served as member of the Governor's (Montana) Crime Commission from 1969 to 1970, and on the Montana League of Cities and Towns from 1967 to 1970.

Shoup was elected as a Republican to the Ninety-second and Ninety-third Congresses (January 3, 1971 – January 3, 1975).

He was an unsuccessful candidate for reelection in 1974 to the Ninety-fourth Congress.

His chief concerns as a U.S. Representative were the Conquest of Cancer Act, soldiers missing in action from the Vietnam War, energy development, and proper labeling of beef products.

Other activities 
He served as director of the Union Pacific Railroad from 1975 to 1984.

He died November 25, 1995.

References 

1923 births
1995 deaths
20th-century American politicians
Montana city council members
Mayors of Missoula, Montana
Republican Party members of the United States House of Representatives from Montana
Politicians from Missoula, Montana
University of Montana alumni
United States Army soldiers
United States Army personnel of World War II
United States Army personnel of the Korean War